General Greene Hotel, also known as the Hotel Rappe and Greensburger Hotel, was a historic hotel located at Greensburg, Westmoreland County, Pennsylvania.  It was built in 1903.

It was listed on the National Register of Historic Places on June 16, 1980. It was delisted in 1988, after being demolished.

References

External links

Former National Register of Historic Places in Pennsylvania
Hotel buildings on the National Register of Historic Places in Pennsylvania
Historic American Buildings Survey in Pennsylvania
Hotel buildings completed in 1903
Buildings and structures in Westmoreland County, Pennsylvania
1903 establishments in Pennsylvania
National Register of Historic Places in Westmoreland County, Pennsylvania